Gizela Niedurny (born 31 January 1939) is a Polish gymnast. She competed at the 1960 Summer Olympics and the 1964 Summer Olympics.

References

1939 births
Living people
Polish female artistic gymnasts
Olympic gymnasts of Poland
Gymnasts at the 1960 Summer Olympics
Gymnasts at the 1964 Summer Olympics
Sportspeople from Ruda Śląska
20th-century Polish women